is a Japanese jazz musician. Ohno is known for his musical scoring of Japanese anime television series, particularly Lupin III, and most famously the 1977 series Lupin III Part II and the feature film The Castle of Cagliostro.

Early life
Born in the founding family of Atami City's Hotel Ohnoya, Ohno began playing piano in elementary school. He formed the group Junior Light Music with clarinetist and future NHK announcer Isamu Akashi, a classmate at Keio Senior High School. It was at this time that he taught himself jazz. While enrolled in the Faculty of Law at Keio University he was a member of the prestigious big band "Keio University Light Music Society". Later in college, on the recommendation of Fujica rainbow two, he joined a quintet with Takeshi Shibuya.

Career
Ohno made his recording debut in 1966 backing Hideo Shiraki and Yūzō Kayama on their record Hideo Shiraki Meets Yuzo Kayama.

He took a leave of absence from the piano in the early 1970s and devoted himself to composing, working on TV dramas and movie accompaniments. In 1976, Ohno composed the score for the film The Inugami Family. Kōji Ishizaka, who starred in the film, was a classmate of Ohno's at Keio High School and Keio University. The promotional literature for the theatrical release contains an article about Ishizaka's visit to Ohno's recording studio.

Discography
 Sound Adventure Act.1 (1975)
 Yoshiko Sai – Mangekyou (Producer/Composer) (1975)
 The Inugami Family (1976)
 Space Kid (1978)
 Daitsuiseki (1978)
 Silent Dialogue (1979, with Masa Matsuda)
 The Golden Dog: Original Sound Track (1979)
 Captain Future Original Soundtrack [キャプテン・フューチャー – Original Sound Track] (1979)
 Cosmos (1981)
 Lifetide (1982)
 Space Cobra (1983, with Kentaro Haneda)
 Lupin The 3rd: Perfect Collection (1984)
 Lupin III Theme Collection (1991)
 Lupin the Third 「JAZZ」 (1999)
 Lupin the Third 「JAZZ」 the 2nd (2000)
 Lupin the Third 「JAZZ」 the 3rd. Funky & Pop (2001)
 Lupin the Third 「JAZZ」 Another Jazz (2002)
 Lupin the Third 「JAZZ」 Bossa & Fusion (2002)
 Lupin the Third 「JAZZ」 Christmas (2003)
 Lupin the Third 「JAZZ」 Plays the "Standards (2003)
 Lupin the Third 「JAZZ」 Plays the "Standards" & Others (2004)
 Lupin Trois (2004, with Kahimi Karie)
 Lupin the Third 「JAZZ」 Cool for Joy (2005)
 Lupin the Third 「JAZZ」 the 10th, New Flight (2006)
 Lupin the Third 「JAZZ」 What's Going On (2007, with the Lupintic Five)

Filmography
 The Inugami Family (1976)
 Proof of the Man (1977)
 Lupin III Part II (1977-1978) 
 One Million-Year Trip: Bander Book (1978) - Television film
 The Mystery of Mamo (1978)
 The Golden Dog (1979)
 Undersea Super Train: Marine Express (1979) - Television film
 The Castle of Cagliostro (1979)
 Fumoon (1980) - Television film
 Andromeda Stories (1982) - Television film
 A Time Slip of 10,000 Years: Prime Rose (1983) - Television film
 Lupin III Part III (1984-1985)
 Mighty Orbots (1984)
 Legend of the Gold of Babylon (1985)
 Bye Bye, Lady Liberty (1989) - Television film
 The Hemingway Papers (1990) - Television film
 Napoleon's Dictionary (1991) - Television film
 From Russia with Love (1992) - Television film
 Voyage to Danger (1993) - Television film
 Dragon of Doom (1994) - Television film
 Farewell to Nostradamus (1995)
 The Pursuit of Harimao's Treasure (1995) - Television film
 Lupin III: Dead or Alive (1996) - Main theme only
 The Secret of Twilight Gemini (1996) - Television film
 Island of Assassins (1997) - Television film
 Crisis in Tokyo (1998) - Television film
 The Columbus Files (1999) - Television film
 Missed by a Dollar (2000) - Television film
 Alcatraz Connection (2001) - Television film
 Episode 0: The First Contact (2002) - Television film
 Operation Return the Treasure (2003) - Television filn
 Stolen Lupin ~The Copy Cat is a Midsummer's Butterfly~ (2004) - Television film
 An Angel's Tactics – Fragments of a Dream Are the Scent of Murder (2005) - Television film
 Seven Days Rhapsody (2006) - Television film
 Elusiveness of the Fog (2007) - Television film
 Sweet Lost Night ~Magic Lamp's Nightmare Premonition~ (2008) - Television film
 Lupin III vs. Detective Conan (2009) - Television film, with Katsuo Ōno
 The Last Job (2010) - Television film
 Blood Seal - Eternal Mermaid (2011) - Television film
 Record of Observations of the East - Another Page (2012) - Television film
 Princess of the Breeze - Hidden City in the Sky (2013) - Television film
 Lupin III vs. Detective Conan: The Movie (2013) - Television film, with Katsuo Ōno
 Lupin III Part IV (2015-2016) - Japan only
 Italian Game (2016) - Television film
 Lupin III Part V (2018)
 Goodbye Partner (2019) - Television film
 Prison of the Past (2019) - Television film
 Lupin III Part VI (2021)

References

External links
  
 Yuji Ohno Official YouTube Channel
 Yuji Ohno anime at Media Arts Database 
 
 
 Ordinary Europe LaserDisc

1941 births
Anime composers
Japanese film score composers
Japanese jazz composers
Japanese jazz musicians
Japanese male film score composers
Keio University alumni
Living people
Lupin the Third
Male jazz composers
Musicians from Shizuoka Prefecture